Robert Hyde (10 October 1650 – 1722) of Hindon, Wiltshire and Heale, Woodford, Wiltshire was an English politician who sat in the English House of Commons between 1677 and 1707 and in the British House of Commons from 1708 to 1722.

Hyde was the second (and eldest surviving) son of Alexander Hyde, who was Bishop of Salisbury from 1665 to 1667, and his wife Mary Townson, daughter of Robert Townson, who was Bishop of Salisbury from 1620 to 1621. He succeeded to the estates of his uncle Sir Robert Hyde in 1665 and to his father's in 1667. He matriculated at Magdalen Hall, Oxford in 1666 and was admitted at the Middle Temple in 1667. In 1673 he was called to the bar.

He married Lady Finetta Pope, daughter of Thomas Pope, 3rd Earl of Downe on 4 May 1674. She died on 16 October 1700 and Hyde married again to Arundell Penruddock, daughter of Thomas Penruddock, MP of Compton Chamberlayne, Wiltshire on 26 January 1704.

Hyde was returned as a Member of Parliament (MP) for Hindon in 1677 and sat until 1679. He was returned as MP again in 1685 and in succeeding general elections until 1698. He was returned as MP for Wiltshire in 1702 and again in the general elections of 1708, 1710, 1713, 1715 and 1722 when he was too infirm to attend the poll.

Hyde died on 20 April 1722.

References

1650 births
1722 deaths
Alumni of Magdalen Hall, Oxford
Members of the Middle Temple
Members of the Parliament of England (pre-1707) for Wiltshire
English MPs 1661–1679
English MPs 1685–1687
English MPs 1689–1690
English MPs 1690–1695
English MPs 1695–1698
English MPs 1702–1705
English MPs 1705–1707
British MPs 1707–1708
British MPs 1708–1710
British MPs 1710–1713
British MPs 1713–1715
British MPs 1715–1722
Members of the Parliament of Great Britain for Wiltshire